Alciston is a village and civil parish in the Wealden district of East Sussex, England. The ecclesiastical parish is linked with that of Selmeston and Berwick.

Saxon in origin, its name was then Aelfsige; it is mentioned in the Domesday Book. The present 14th-century church, of unknown dedication, is built of chalk from the nearby South Downs. There is a large medieval tithe barn in the village.

Every Good Friday, the road outside the Rose Cottage Inn is closed for the villagers to take part in a traditional skipping contest.

The historian C.V. Wedgwood is buried in the church graveyard.

Governance

The lowest tier of government for Alciston is a parish meeting. Instead of voting for representatives, a small parish may hold a community meeting twice a year to which all the electors may attend and vote on issues.

Wealden District Council is the next tier of government, for which Alciston is part of the Alfriston ward, along with Alfriston, Berwick, Chalvington & Ripe and Selmeston. The ward returns one councillor, who was David Watts in the 2019 election.

Alciston is represented at the East Sussex County Council as part of the East Hoathly & Hellingly Division. The May 2017 election returned the Conservative councillor Nick Bennett.

The parliamentary constituency for Alciston is Lewes. The general election in May 2015 returned Maria Caulfield as MP.

Prior to Brexit in 2020, Alciston was part of the South East England constituency in the European Parliament.

References

External links
 
 

Villages in East Sussex
Civil parishes in East Sussex
Wealden District